Kuchek Bisheh-ye Mahalleh (also Romanized as Kūchek Bīsheh Maḩalleh; also known as Bīsheh Maḩalleh-ye Kūchak) is a village in Emamzadeh Abdollah Rural District, Dehferi District, Fereydunkenar County, Mazandaran Province, Iran. At the 2006 census, its population was 939, in 239 families.

References 

Populated places in Fereydunkenar County